This is a timeline documenting the events of heavy metal in the year 2023.

Bands disbanded
 Palisades
 Power Quest
 Russkaja
 Terrorizer

Bands reformed
 Haste the Day (one-off show)
 Wrathchild

Events
 Kiss is expected to conclude their End of the Road World Tour this year with a set of back-to-back final shows set to take place in their hometown of New York on December 1 and 2 at Madison Square Garden.
 On January 26, Twisted Sister reunited for a one-off performance following their induction into the Metal Hall of Fame. It was the band's first live performance since disbanding in 2016.

Deaths
 January 1 – Sebastian Marino, former guitarist of Overkill and Anvil, died from a heart attack at the age of 57.
 January 9 – Justin Bartlett, artist who created album cover art for Sunn O))), Trap Them, Cadaver, and Hooded Menace, died from stage 4 colorectal cancer at the age of 45.
 January 18 – TJ de Blois, former drummer of A Life Once Lost, died from undisclosed reasons.
 February 14 – Tim Aymar, vocalist of Pharaoh and former vocalist of Control Denied, died from undisclosed reasons at the age of 59.
 February 16 – Michael "Majk Moti" Kupper, former guitarist of Running Wild, died from undisclosed reasons at the age of 65.
 March 8 – Jim Durkin, guitarist of Dark Angel, died from undisclosed reasons at the age of 58.
 March 8 – Josua Madsen, drummer of Artillery, died after being hit by a bus at the age of 45.

Albums expected

January

February

March

April

May

June

July

August

September

November

Artists with material in production

References

Heavy Metal
2020s in heavy metal music